Matthias Jakob Schleiden (5 April 1804 – 23 June 1881) was a German botanist and co-founder of cell theory, along with Theodor Schwann and Rudolf Virchow.

Career
Matthias Jakob Schleiden was born in Hamburg. on 5 April 1804. His father was the municipal physician of Hamburg. Schleiden pursued legal studies 
 
graduating in 1827. He then established a legal practice 

but after a period of emotional depression and attempted suicide, he changed professions. The suicide attempt left a prominent scar across his forehead.

He studied natural science at the University of Göttingen in Göttingen, Germany, but transferred to the University of Berlin in 1835 to study plants. Johann Horkel, Schleiden's uncle, encouraged him to study plant embryology. 

He soon developed his love for botany and cats into a full-time pursuit. Schleiden preferred to study plant structure under the microscope. As a professor of botany at the University of Jena, he wrote Contributions to our Knowledge of Phytogenesis (1838), in which he stated that all plants are composed of cells. Thus, Schleiden and Schwann became the first to formulate what was then an informal belief as a principle of biology equal in importance to the atomic theory of chemistry. He also recognized the importance of the cell nucleus, discovered in 1831 by the Scottish botanist Robert Brown, and sensed its connection with cell division.

He became a professor of botany at the University of Dorpat in 1863. He concluded that all plant parts are made of cells and that an embryonic plant organism arises from one cell.

He died in Frankfurt am Main on 23 June 1881.

Evolution

Schleiden was an early advocate of evolution. In a lecture on the "History of the Vegetable World" published in his book Die Pflanze und ihr Leben ("The Plant: A Biography") (1848) was a passage that embraced the transmutation of species. He was one of the first German biologists to accept Charles Darwin's theory of evolution. He has been described as a leading proponent of Darwinism in Germany.

With Die Pflanze und ihr Leben, reprinted six times by 1864,  and his Studien: Populäre Vorträge ("Studies: Popular Lectures"), both written in a way that was accessible to lay readers, Schleiden contributed to creating a momentum for popularizing science in Germany.

Selected publications

 On the Development of the Organization in Phaenogamous Plants (1838)

 The Plant, a Biography (1848) [translated by Arthur Henfrey]

References

External links

 Short biography and bibliography in the Virtual Laboratory of the Max Planck Institute for the History of Science

 Schwann, Theodor and Schleyden, M. J., Microscopical researches into the accordance in the structure and growth of animals and plants. London: Printed for the Sydenham Society, 1847.

 

 

 

 

1804 births
1881 deaths
Burials at Frankfurt Main Cemetery
19th-century German botanists
Heidelberg University alumni
Scientists from Hamburg
Proto-evolutionary biologists
Academic staff of the University of Jena
Academic staff of the University of Tartu